Dizdar is a Bosniak and Turkish surname derived from the Ottoman title of Dizdar. Notable people with the surname include:

Adnan Dizdar (born 1949), Yugoslav handball player
Can Dizdar, Turkish diplomat
Ece Dizdar (born 1981), Turkish actress
Hamid Dizdar (1907-1967), Bosnian writer
Jasmin Dizdar (born 1961), British-Bosnian director and author
Mak Dizdar (1917-1971), Bosnian poet
Merve Dizdar (born 1986), Turkish actress
Natali Dizdar (born 1984), Croatian singer
Petra Dizdar (born 1984), Croatian tennis player
Şefik Yılmaz Dizdar (born 1938), Turkish businessman
Zdravko Dizdar (born 1948), Croatian historian
Zeynep Dizdar (born 1976), Turkish singer-songwriter and composer

Surnames
Bosnian surnames
Surnames of Turkish origin